SolydXK is a Dutch Linux distribution based on Debian. It aims to be simple to use, providing an environment that is stable, secure, and ideal for small businesses, non-profit organizations and home users.

SolydXK includes proprietary software such as Adobe Flash, Steam and optional closed-source drivers to provide initial multimedia usage and gaming on Linux.

History 
SolydXK originated in 2012 as an unofficial version of "Linux Mint Debian edition" (LMDE) using the KDE Plasma 4 workspaces.

In November 2012, Linux Mint ceased maintaining both the KDE and Xfce versions of LMDE. SolydXK was started to support these two desktop environments. "SolydX" refers to the Xfce version, while "SolydK" refers to the KDE version. The project name is an amalgam of the two names.

Features 
The two core editions for SolydXK, SolydX and SolydK, are officially available in 64-bit Live CDs with installers.

The distribution installs with common software such as Firefox, LibreOffice, XChat/Quassel, Pidgin/Kopete, and GIMP for a variety of common tasks. Both editions also provide Steam and PlayOnLinux installed for gaming, and a driver manager to easily enable the best gaming performance.

SolydXK, originally based on Debian testing, since January 2015 is built on Debian Stable.

There are also Community Editions, not officially tested nor supported by the SolydXK team. Examples are the SolydXK Enthusiast's Edition - versions of SolydX and SolydK that follow Debian testing, the 32-bit community editions and the version for Raspberry Pi 3.

Version history

References

External links 

 
 
 SolydXK on Twitter
SolydXK on OpenSourceFeed Gallery

Computer-related introductions in 2013
2013 software
Debian-based distributions
X86-64 Linux distributions
Linux distributions